The Yoga Narasimha Temple at Baggavalli, a Hoysala era construction was built in the early 13th century. Baggavalli is a village in Tarikere Taluq in the Chikkamagaluru district of Karnataka state, India. The monument is protected by the Karnataka state division of Archaeological Survey of India.

Notes

References

Gallery

Hindu temples in Chikkamagaluru district
Hoysala Empire
13th-century Hindu temples